The  National Literature Prize for Narrative (Spanish: Premio Nacional de Literatura en la modalidad de Narrativa) is a prize awarded by Spain's Ministry of Culture for a novel written by a Spanish author in any of the languages of Spain. The prize is 20,000 euros.

Prior to 1977, the prize appeared and disappeared several times, being given by different institutions.

Past winners 

 1924 – Huberto Pérez de la Ossa (1897–1983), for La Santa Duquesa
 1925 – No award
 1926 – Wenceslao Fernández Flórez (1885–1964), for Las siete columnas
 1927 – Concha Espina (1º) (1869–1955), for Altar mayor
 1928 – No award
 1929 – No award
 1930 – No award
 1931 – Mauricio Bacarisse (1895–1931), for Los terribles amores de Agliberto y Celedonia
 1932 – Alejandro Casona (1903–1965), for Flor de leyendas
 1933 – No award
 1934 – No award
 1935 – Ramón J. Sender (1901–1982), for Míster Witt en el cantón
 1936 – Ricardo Baroja (1917–1988), for La nao Capitana
 1937 – No award
 1938 – No award
 1939 – No award
 1940 – No award
 1941 – No award
 1942 – No award
 1943 – Rafael García Serrano (1917–1988), for La fiel Infantería
 1944 – No award
 1945 – No award
 1946 – No award
 1947 – Vicente Escrivá (1913–1999), for Jornadas de Miguel de Cervantes
 1948 – Juan Antonio Zunzunegui (1º) (1900–1982), for La úlcera
 1949 – No award
 1950 – Concha Espina (1869–1955), for Valle en el mar
 1952 – José María Sánchez-Silva (1911–2002), for Marcelino pan y vino
 1953 – José María Gironella (1917–2003), for Los cipreses creen en Dios
 1954 – Tomás Salvador (1921–1984), for Cuerda de presos
 1955 – José Luis Castillo-Puche (1919–2004), for Con la muerte al hombro (1º)
 1956 – Miguel Delibes (1920–2010), for Diario de un cazador (1º)
 1957 – Carmen Laforet (1921–2004), for La mujer nueva
 1958 – Alejandro Núñez Alonso (1905–1982), for El lazo de púrpura
 1959 – Ana María Matute (1925–2014), for Los hijos muertos
 1960 – Daniel Sueiro (1936–1986), for Los conspiradores
 1961 – Manuel Halcón (1900–1989), for Monólogos de una mujer fría
 1962 – Torcuato Luca de Tena (1923–1999), for Embajador en el infierno
 1963 – Emilio Romero (1917–2003), for Cartas a un príncipe
 1964 – Salvador García de Pruneda (1912–1996), for La encrucijada de Carabanchel
 1965 – Ignacio Agustí (1913–1974), for 19 de julio
 1968 – Carlos Rojas (1928-2020), for Auto de fe
 1975 – Aquilino Duque (1931–2021), for El mono azul
 1977 – José Luis Acquaroni (1919–1983), for Copa de sombra
 1978 – Carmen Martín Gaite (1925–2000), for El cuarto de atrás
 1979 – Jesús Fernández Santos (1926–1988), for Extramuros
 1980 – Alonso Zamora Vicente (1916–2006), for Mesa, sobremesa
 1981 – Gonzalo Torrente Ballester (1910–1999), for La isla de los jacintos cortados
 1982 – José Luis Castillo-Puche (1919–2004), for Conocerás el poso de la nada (2º)
 1983 – Francisco Ayala (1906–2009), for Recuerdos y olvidos: 1. El exilio
 1984 – Camilo José Cela (1916–2002), for Mazurca para dos muertos
 1985 – It was not awarded
 1986 – Alfredo Conde (1945), for Xa vai o griffón no vento (Galician)
 1987 – Luis Mateo Díez (1942), for La fuente de la edad (1º)
 1988 – Antonio Muñoz Molina (1956), for El invierno en Lisboa (1º)
 1989 – Bernardo Atxaga (1951), for Obabakoak (Basque)
 1990 – Luis Landero (1948), for Juegos de la edad tardía
 1991 – Manuel Vázquez Montalbán (1939–2003), for Galíndez
 1992 – Antonio Muñoz Molina (1956), for El jinete polaco (2º)
 1993 – Luis Goytisolo (1935), for Estatua con palomas
 1994 – Gustavo Martín Garzo (1948), for El lenguaje de las fuentes
 1995 – Carme Riera (1948), for Dins el darrer blau (Catalan)
 1996 – Manuel Rivas (1957), for Que me queres, amor?  (Galician)
 1997 – Álvaro Pombo (1939), for Donde las mujeres
 1998 – Alfredo Bryce Echenique (1939), for Reo de nocturnidad
 1999 – Miguel Delibes (1920–2010), for El hereje (2º)
 2000 – Luis Mateo Díez (1942), for La ruina del cielo (2º)
 2001 – Juan Marsé (1933), for Rabos de lagartija
 2002 – Unai Elorriaga (1973), for SPrako tranbia (Basque)
 2003 – Suso de Toro (1956), for Trece badaladas (Galician)
 2004 – Juan Manuel de Prada (1970), for La vida invisible
 2005 – Alberto Méndez (1941–2004), for Los girasoles ciegos
 2006 – Ramiro Pinilla (1923–2014), for Las cenizas del hierro
 2007 – Vicente Molina Foix (1946), for El abrecartas
 2008 – Juan José Millás (1946), for El mundo
 2009 – Kirmen Uribe (1970), for Bilbao-New York-Bilbao (Basque)
 2010 – Javier Cercas (1962), for The Anatomy of a Moment
 2011 – Marcos Giralt Torrente (1968), for Tiempo de vida
 2012 – Javier Marías (1951), for The Infatuations (Los enamoramientos) (rejected)
 2013 – José María Merino (1942), for El río del Edén
 2014 – Rafael Chirbes (1949–2015), for En la orilla
 2015 – Ignacio Martínez de Pisón (1960), for La buena reputación
 2016 – Cristina Fernández Cubas (1945), for La habitación de Nona
 2017 – Fernando Aramburu (1959), for Patria
 2018 – Almudena Grandes (1960) for Los pacientes del Doctor García
 2019 – Cristina García Morales (1985), for Lectura fácil
 2020 – Juan Bonilla (1966), for Totalidad sexual del cosmos
 2021 – Xesús Fraga (1971), for Virtudes (e misterios) (Galician)
 2022 – Marilar Aleixandre (1947), for As malas mulleres (Galician)

References

External links 
Ministerio de Educación, Cultura y Deporte

1924 establishments in Spain
Awards established in 1924
Spanish literary awards